Benatia is a surname. Notable people with the surname include:

 Abdelmadjid Benatia (born 1984), Algerian footballer
 Medhi Benatia (born 1987), French-born Moroccan footballer